EMB Consultancy, also known as EMB Actuaries and Consultants, is an international actuarial business consultancy and software provider.  EMB was originally established as a strategic and actuarial advisor to non-life insurers. The company has developed and now operates in a growing range of business functions and sectors, such as banking, investments, asset management, fraud prevention, risk enterprise management, mergers and acquisitions and marketing. These are areas where the widespread collection and use of data and financial models have become commonplace.

History 

EMB was founded in 1993 by Andrew English and Mike Brockman, who were later joined by Peter Matthews. EMB thus stands for English-Matthews-Brockman, the founding members of the company.

The company now employs over 300 people in 11 countries. Revenues in the year to April 2009 were £27 million. It has twice received the Queen's Awards for Enterprise, first in 2003 for Innovation and again in 2007 for International Sales.

EMB is headquartered in Epsom, UK, internationally renowned as the home of The Derby.

EMB was acquired by Towers Watson on 1 Feb 2011.

Software 

The company is one of the world’s leading providers of actuarial and analytical software with the majority of the largest non-life insurers (by gross premium income) using EMB's software. Key software sold worldwide include 
- Emblem
- Radar & Classifier (Pricing) 
- ResQ (Reserving)
- Igloo (Capital Modeling) 
- RePro (Reinsurance)

Offices 

EMB Offices include:

UK: Epsom, London & Cambridge

United States of America (USA): San Diego, San Antonio, Chicago & Changrin Falls

Germany: Cologne

France: Paris

Scandinavia: Norway

Spain: Madrid

Netherlands: Amsterdam

South Africa: Johannesburg

India: Haryana

Japan: Tokyo

Brazil : São Paulo

Australia (Quantium Group): Sydney

Research 

In addition to its client consultancy work, EMB carries out widely quoted industry analysis and research.

Together with Confused.com, EMB jointly researches and publishes the quarterly Confused.com/EMB UK Car Insurance Price Index. In addition, it produces an annual Motor Insurance Industry Report, analysing the performance of UK motor insurers based on returns to the Financial Services Authority. The company also carries out regular research into UK consumer attitudes towards aggregators. Alongside its advice to clients on Solvency II, it has also investigated the potential financial impact of aspects of the EU-wide legislation due to come into effect in 2012.

EMB staff were closely involved in the International Underwriting Association 2007 Bodily Injury Awards study. Several partners and consultants are also part of working parties for professional bodies such as the Institute of Actuaries and the Casualty Actuarial Society, covering subjects such as asbestos-related diseases and usage-based car insurance.

EMB staff have also contributed to the refining of the actuarial education curriculum for the non-life insurance field.

Future 

In late 2010, Towers Watson, a NYSE listed management consulting company, signed a definitive agreement to acquire EMB. The company is due to trade under the Towers Watson name in 2011. EMB will likely form the non-life consulting division of Towers Watson. All software will become the licensed property of Towers Watson.

References

External links 
 EMB website – https://web.archive.org/web/20110828192635/http://www.emb.com/
 International Underwriting Association - https://web.archive.org/web/20070626095602/http://www.iua.co.uk/AM/Template.cfm?Section=Home
 Confused.com - http://www.confused.com/
 Casualty Actuarial Society - http://casact.org/
 Institute of Actuaries (UK) - https://web.archive.org/web/20120717024200/http://www.actuaries.org.uk/
 Financial Services Authority - http://www.fsa.gov.uk/
 Solvency II – http://www.solvency-2.com
 Merek dagang
 SMS API
 winbox 下载

Actuarial firms
International management consulting firms